The European Economic Area (EEA) was established via the Agreement on the European Economic Area, an international agreement which enables the extension of the European Union's single market to member states of the European Free Trade Association. The EEA links the EU member states and three EFTA states (Iceland, Liechtenstein, and Norway) into an internal market governed by the same basic rules. These rules aim to enable free movement of persons, goods, services, and capital within the European single market, including the freedom to choose residence in any country within this area. The EEA was established on 1 January 1994 upon entry into force of the EEA Agreement. The contracting parties are the EU, its member states, and Iceland, Liechtenstein, and Norway.

The EEA Treaty is a commercial treaty and differs from the EU Treaties in certain key respects. According to Article 1 its purpose is to "promote a continuous and balanced strengthening of trade and economic relation". The EFTA members do not participate in the Common Agricultural Policy or the Common Fisheries Policy.

The right to free movement of persons between EEA member states and the relevant provisions on safeguard measures are identical to those applying between members of the EU. The right and rules applicable in all EEA member states, including those which are not members of the EU, are specified in Directive 2004/38/EC and in the EEA Agreement.

The EEA Agreement specifies that membership is open to member states either of the EU or of the EFTA. EFTA states that are party to the EEA Agreement participate in the EU's internal market without being members of the EU or the European Union Customs Union. They adopt most EU legislation concerning the single market, with notable exclusions including laws regarding the Common Agricultural Policy and Common Fisheries Policy. The EEA's "decision-shaping" processes enable EEA EFTA member states to influence and contribute to new EEA policy and legislation from an early stage. Third country goods are excluded for these states on rules of origin.

When entering into force in 1994, the EEA parties were 17 states and two European Communities: the European Community, which was later absorbed into the EU's wider framework, and the now defunct European Coal and Steel Community. Membership has grown to 30 states as of 2020: 27 EU member states, as well as three of the four member states of the EFTA (Iceland, Liechtenstein and Norway). The Agreement is applied provisionally with respect to Croatia—the remaining and most recent EU member state—pending ratification of its accession by all EEA parties. One EFTA member, Switzerland, has not joined the EEA, but has a set of bilateral sectoral agreements with the EU which allow it to participate in the internal market.

Origins

In the late 1980s, the EFTA member states, led by Sweden, began looking at options to join the then-existing European Economic Community (EEC), the precursor of the European Union (EU). The reasons identified for this are manifold. Many authors cite the economic downturn at the beginning of the 1980s, and the subsequent adoption by the EEC of the "Europe 1992 agenda", as a primary reason. Arguing from a liberal intergovernmentalist perspective, these authors argue that large multinational corporations in EFTA countries, especially Sweden, pressed for EEC membership under threat of relocating their production abroad. Other authors point to the end of the Cold War, which made joining the EEC less politically controversial for neutral countries.

Meanwhile, Jacques Delors, who was President of the European Commission at the time, did not like the idea of the EEC enlarging with more member states, as he feared that it would impede the ability of the Community to complete internal market reform and establish monetary union. He proposed a European Economic Space (EES) in January 1989, which was later renamed the European Economic Area, as it is known today.

By the time the EEA was established in 1994, however, several developments hampered its credibility. First of all, Switzerland rejected the EEA agreement in a national referendum on 6 December 1992, obstructing full EU-EFTA integration within the EEA. Furthermore, Austria had applied for full EEC membership in 1989, and was followed by Finland, Norway, Sweden, and Switzerland between 1991 and 1992 (Norway's EU accession was rejected in a referendum, Switzerland froze its EU application after the EEA agreement was rejected in a referendum). The fall of the Iron Curtain had made the EU less hesitant to accept these highly developed countries as member states, since that would relieve the pressure on the EU's budget when the former socialist countries of Central Europe were to join.

Membership

The EEA Agreement was signed in Porto on 2 May 1992 by the then seven states of the European Free Trade Association (EFTA), the European Community (EC) and its then 12 member states. On 6 December 1992, Switzerland's voters rejected the ratification of the agreement in a constitutionally mandated referendum, effectively freezing the application for EC membership submitted earlier in the year. Switzerland is instead linked to the EU by a series of bilateral agreements. On 1 January 1995, three erstwhile members of the EFTA—Austria, Finland and Sweden—acceded to the European Union, which had superseded the European Community upon the entry into force of the Maastricht Treaty on 1 November 1993. Liechtenstein's participation in the EEA was delayed until 1 May 1995. Any European State becoming a member of the EU shall, or becoming a member of EFTA may, apply to become a Party to the EEA agreement according to article 128 of the agreement.

, the contracting parties to the EEA are three of the four EFTA member states and the 27 EU member states. The newest EU member, Croatia, finished negotiating their accession to the EEA in November 2013, and since 12 April 2014 has provisionally applied the agreement pending its ratification by all EEA member states.

Treaties
Besides the 1992 Treaty, 1 amending treaty was signed, as well as 3 treaties to allow for accession of new members of the European Union.

Ratification of the EEA Agreement

Notes

Future enlargement

Recent EU member states
When a state joins the EU, they do not necessarily immediately become part of the EEA but are obliged to apply. Following the 2004 enlargement of the EU, which saw Cyprus, the Czech Republic, Estonia, Hungary, Latvia, Lithuania, Malta, Poland, Slovakia and Slovenia acceding to the EU on 1 May 2004, the EEA Enlargement Agreement was applied on a provisional basis to the 10 acceding countries as from the date of their accession in May 2004 to the EU. On the other hand, following the 2007 enlargement of the EU, which saw Bulgaria and Romania acceding to the EU on 1 January 2007, an EEA Enlargement Agreement was not signed until 25 July 2007 and only provisionally entered into force on 1 August 2007. The agreement did not fully enter into force until 9 November 2011.

Croatia

Prior to the 2013 enlargement of the EU, which saw Croatia acceding to the EU on 1 July 2013, an EEA Enlargement Agreement was not signed. Croatia signed its Treaty of Accession to the EU on 9 December 2011 and subsequently lodged their application to the EEA on 13 September 2012. Negotiations started on 15 March 2013 in Brussels, with the aim of achieving simultaneous accession to both the EU and the EEA on 1 July 2013. However, this was not achieved.

On 20 November 2013, it was announced that an enlargement agreement was reached. The text was initialled on 20 December 2013, and following its signature in April 2014 the agreement is being provisionally applied pending ratification by Croatia, all EEA states, and the European Union. As of January 2023, the agreement has been ratified by 24 out of 31 parties.

Future EU member states

There are eight recognised candidates for membership of the European Union: Turkey (since 1999), North Macedonia (2005), Montenegro (2010), Serbia (2012), Albania (2014), Moldova (2022), Ukraine (2022), and Bosnia and Herzegovina (2022). Kosovo (whose independence is not recognised by five EU member states) and Georgia formally submitted applications for membership in 2022 and are considered potential candidates by the European Union.

In mid-2005, representatives of the Faroe Islands hinted at the possibility of their territory joining the EFTA. However, the ability of the Faroes to join is uncertain because, according to Article 56 of the EFTA Convention, only states may become members of the Association. The Faroes, which form part of the Danish Realm, is not a sovereign state, and according to a report prepared for the Faroes Ministry of Foreign Affairs "under its constitutional status the Faroes cannot become an independent Contracting Party to the EEA Agreement due to the fact that the Faroes are not a state". However, the report went on to suggest that it is possible that the "Kingdom of Denmark in respect of the Faroes" could join the EFTA. The Danish Government has stated that the Faroes cannot become an independent member of the EEA as Denmark is already a party to the EEA Agreement. The Faroes already have an extensive bilateral free trade agreement with Iceland, known as the Hoyvík Agreement.

European microstates

In November 2012, after the Council of the European Union had called for an evaluation of the EU's relations with the sovereign European microstates of Andorra, Monaco and San Marino, which they described as "fragmented", the European Commission published a report outlining options for their further integration into the EU. Unlike Liechtenstein, which is a member of the EEA via the EFTA and the Schengen Agreement, relations with these three states are based on a collection of agreements covering specific issues. The report examined four alternatives to the current situation: 1) a Sectoral Approach with separate agreements with each state covering an entire policy area, 2) a comprehensive, multilateral Framework Association Agreement (FAA) with the three states, 3) EEA membership, and 4) EU membership. The Commission argued that the sectoral approach did not address the major issues and was still needlessly complicated, while EU membership was dismissed in the near future because "the EU institutions are currently not adapted to the accession of such small-sized countries". The remaining options, EEA membership and a FAA with the states, were found to be viable and were recommended by the commission.

As EEA membership is currently only open to EFTA or EU members, the consent of existing EFTA member states is required for the microstates to join the EEA without becoming members of the EU. In 2011, Jonas Gahr Støre, the then Foreign Minister of Norway which is an EFTA member state, said that EFTA/EEA membership for the microstates was not the appropriate mechanism for their integration into the internal market because their requirements differed from those of larger countries such as Norway, and suggested that a simplified association would be better suited for them. Espen Barth Eide, Støre's successor, responded to the commission's report in late 2012 by questioning whether the microstates have sufficient administrative capabilities to meet the obligations of EEA membership. However, he stated that Norway was open to the possibility of EFTA membership for the microstates if they decide to submit an application, and that the country had not made a final decision on the matter. Pascal Schafhauser, the Counsellor of the Liechtenstein Mission to the EU, said that Liechtenstein, another EFTA member state, was willing to discuss EEA membership for the microstates provided their joining did not impede the functioning of the organisation. However, he suggested that the option of direct membership in the EEA for the microstates, outside both the EFTA and the EU, should be given consideration.

On 18 November 2013, the EU Commission concluded that "the participation of the small-sized countries in the EEA is not judged to be a viable option at present due to the political and institutional reasons", and that Association Agreements were a more feasible mechanism to integrate the microstates into the internal market.

Withdrawal of the United Kingdom

The United Kingdom, in a 2016 referendum, voted to withdraw from the European Union. Staying in the EEA, possibly eventually as an EFTA member, was an option suggested by the then Environment Secretary, Michael Gove.

A 2013 research paper presented to the Parliament of the United Kingdom proposed a number of alternatives to EU membership which would continue to allow it access to the EU's internal market, including continued EEA membership as an EFTA member state, or the Swiss model of a number of bilateral treaties covering the provisions of the single market. The United Kingdom was a co-founder of EFTA in 1960, but ceased to be a member upon joining the European Community. In the first meeting since the Brexit vote, EFTA reacted by saying both that it was open to a United Kingdom return and that it had many issues to work through although the Norwegian Government later expressed reservations. In January 2017, Theresa May, then the British prime minister, announced a 12-point plan of negotiating objectives and confirmed that the government of the United Kingdom would not seek continued permanent membership in the single market. The United Kingdom could be allowed by other member states to join the EEA and EFTA but existing EEA members such as Norway would have concerns about taking the risk of opening a difficult negotiation with the EU that could lead them to lose their current advantages. The Scottish Government has looked into membership of the EFTA to retain access to the EEA. However, other EFTA states have stated that only sovereign states are eligible for membership, so it could only join if it became independent from the United Kingdom.

The EEA EFTA States (Norway, Iceland, Liechtenstein) signed a Separation Agreement with the UK on 28 January 2020, which is understood to mirror the EEA-relevant parts of the EU-UK Withdrawal Agreement. The withdrawal agreement stipulated a transition period, following the UK's formal withdrawal on 31 January 2020 and ending 31 December 2020, during which both the United Kingdom and the other EEA members remained bound by the existing obligations stemming from international agreements concluded by the EU, including the EEA Agreement. In January and February 2020, the government of the United Kingdom ruled out a future alignment to the rules of the internal market, effectively ruling out EEA membership after the end of the transition period on 31 December 2020.

Rights and obligations
The EEA relies on the same "four freedoms" underpinning the European single market as does the European Union: the free movement of goods, persons, services, and capital among the EEA countries. Thus, the EEA countries that are not part of the EU enjoy free trade with the European Union. Also, the 'free movement of persons is one of the core rights guaranteed in the European Economic Area (EEA) [...]. It is perhaps the most important right for individuals, as it gives citizens of the 30 EEA countries the opportunity to live, work, establish business and study in any of these countries'.

As a counterpart, these countries have to adopt part of the Law of the European Union.
However they also contribute to and influence the formation of new EEA relevant policies and legislation at an early stage as part of a formal decision-shaping process.

Agriculture and fisheries are not covered by the EEA. Not being bound by the Common Fisheries Policy is perceived as very important by Norway and Iceland, and a major reason not to join the EU. The Common Fisheries Policy would mean giving away fishing quotas in their waters.

The EEA countries that are not part of the EU do not contribute financially to Union objectives to the same extent as do its members, although they contribute to the EEA Grants scheme to "reduce social and economic disparities in the EEA". Additionally, some choose to take part in EU programmes such as Trans-European Networks and the European Regional Development Fund. Norway also has its own Norway Grants scheme. After the EU/EEA enlargement of 2004, there was a tenfold increase in the financial contribution of the EEA States, in particular Norway, to social and economic cohesion in the Internal Market (€1167 million over five years).

Legislation

The non-EU members of the EEA (Iceland, Liechtenstein and Norway) have agreed to enact legislation similar to that passed in the EU in the areas of social policy, consumer protection, environment, company law and statistics. These are some of the areas covered by the former European Community (the "first pillar" of the European Union).

The non-EU members of the EEA are not represented in Institutions of the European Union such as the European Parliament or European Commission. This situation has been described as "fax democracy", with Norway waiting for their latest legislation to be faxed from the commission. However, EEA countries are consulted about new EU legislative proposals and participate in shaping legislation at an early stage. The EEA Agreement contains provisions for input from the EEA/EFTA countries at various stages before legislation is adopted, including consent at the EEA Joint Committee. Once approved at the EEA Joint Committee, it is part of the EEA Agreement, and the EFTA states within the EEA must implement it in their national law.

Institutions

The EEA Joint Committee consists of the EEA-EFTA States plus the European Commission (representing the EU) and has the function of amending the EEA Agreement to include relevant EU legislation. An EEA Council meets twice yearly to govern the overall relationship between the EEA members.

Rather than setting up pan-EEA institutions, the activities of the EEA are regulated by the European Union institutions, as well as the EFTA Surveillance Authority and the EFTA Court. The EFTA Surveillance Authority and the EFTA Court regulate the activities of the EFTA members in respect of their obligations in the European Economic Area (EEA). The EFTA Surveillance Authority performs the European Commission's role as "guardian of the treaties" for the EFTA countries to ensure the EEA Agreement is being followed. The EFTA Court performs a similar role to the European Court of Justice's in that it resolves disputes under the EEA Agreement.

While the ECJ and European Commission are respectively responsible for the interpretation and application of the EEA Agreement in the EU (between EU member states and within EU member states), and the EFTA Court and EFTA Surveillance Authority are likewise respectively responsible for interpreting and monitoring the application of the EEA Agreement among the EEA-EFTA states (between the EEA-EFTA states and within the EEA-EFTA states), disputes between an EU state and an EEA-EFTA state are referred to the EEA Joint Committee rather to either court. Only if the Joint Committee cannot provide a resolution within three months, would the disputing parties jointly submit to the ECJ for a ruling (if the dispute concerns provisions identical to EU law) or to arbitration (in all other cases).

The original plan for the EEA lacked the EFTA Court or the EFTA Surveillance Authority, as the "EEA court" (which would be composed of five European Court of Justice members and three members from EFTA countries and which would be functionally integrated with the ECJ) and the European Commission were to exercise those roles. However, during the negotiations for the EEA agreement, the European Court of Justice informed the Council of the European Union (Opinion 1/91) that they considered that giving the EEA court jurisdiction with respect to EU law that would be part of the EEA law, would be a violation of the treaties, and therefore the current arrangement was developed instead. After having negotiated the Surveillance Authority, the ECJ confirmed its legality in Opinion 1/92.

The EFTA Secretariat is headquartered in Geneva, Switzerland. The EFTA Surveillance Authority has its headquarters in Brussels, Belgium (the same location as the headquarters of the European Commission), while the EFTA Court has its headquarters in Luxembourg (the same location as the headquarters of the European Court of Justice).

EEA and Norway Grants

The EEA and Norway Grants are the financial contributions of Iceland, Liechtenstein and Norway to reduce social and economic disparities in Europe. In the period from 2004 to 2009, €1.3 billion of project funding is made available for project funding in the 15 beneficiary states in Central and Southern Europe.

Established in conjunction with the 2004 enlargement of the European Economic Area (EEA), which brings together the EU, Iceland, Liechtenstein and Norway in the Internal Market, the EEA and Norway Grants were administered by the Financial Mechanism Office, which is affiliated to the EFTA Secretariat in Brussels.

See also
Rules of Origin
Market access
Free-trade area
Tariffs
EudraVigilance
European integration
Free trade areas in Europe
European Union free trade agreements
Central European Free Trade Agreement
European Free Trade Association (EFTA)
EU enlargement to EFTA states
Iceland–European Union relations
Liechtenstein–European Union relations
Norway–European Union relations
Switzerland–European Union relations
Parallel importation
Schengen Agreement
Societas cooperativa Europaea
European Union Customs Union
Trade bloc
Eurasian Economic Union

References

External links

Text of the EEA Agreement
Information about the EEA on the website of the Mission of Norway to the EU 
EEA Grants and Norway Grants
The EU and the European Economic Area Europa (web portal): External Relations

 
1993 in Belgium
1993 in the European Union
1994 establishments in Europe
Foreign relations of Croatia
Foreign relations of the European Union
Foreign relations of Iceland
Foreign relations of Liechtenstein
Foreign relations of Norway
Foreign relations of Switzerland
Iceland–European Union relations
Intergovernmental organizations established by treaty
International organizations based in Europe
International relations
Multi-speed Europe
Organizations established in 1994
Norway–European Union relations
Switzerland–European Union relations
Treaties concluded in 1993
Treaties entered into force in 1994
United Kingdom and the European Union
March 1993 events

la:Consociatio Europaea liberi commercii#Spatium oeconomicum Europaeum